Aybulyak (Aybüläk) is a rural locality (a selo) in Bayguzinsky Selsoviet, Yanaulsky District, Bashkortostan, Russia. The population was 285 as of 2010. There are 5 streets.

Geography 
Aybulyak is located 16 km southwest of Yanaul (the district's administrative centre) by road. Progress is the nearest rural locality.

References 

Rural localities in Yanaulsky District